Murray Hill is a mountain located in the Catskill Mountains of New York east-northeast of Ellenville. Murray Hill was named after a former landowner. Margaret Cliff is located east, and Mount Don Bosco is located west-southwest of Murray Hill.

References

Mountains of Ulster County, New York
Mountains of New York (state)